The E.A. and Rebecca (Johnson) Marsh House is a historic dwelling located in Grinnell, Iowa, United States.  Marsh was a jeweler and a leading businessman in the city.  His wife, Rebecca Penrose Johnson, bought the property in 1891.  Her father was a successful businessman who amassed his own fortune, which is probably why the property was bought in her name.  The two-story frame structure features a hipped roof with cross gables and a corner tower.  It is one 19 Queen Anne houses in Grinnell with a corner tower.  Unlike most of the others, it has maintained a high degree of historic integrity.  The house was listed on the National Register of Historic Places in 1999.

References

Houses completed in 1893
Grinnell, Iowa
Houses in Poweshiek County, Iowa
Houses on the National Register of Historic Places in Iowa
National Register of Historic Places in Poweshiek County, Iowa
Queen Anne architecture in Iowa